Clarence Eugene Shaw, sometimes credited as Gene Shaw (June 16, 1926 – August 17, 1973) was an American jazz trumpeter and a student of Fourth Way psychology.

Early life
Shaw was born in Detroit on June 16, 1926. He played the piano and trombone as a child. He began playing trumpet around 1946 after hearing Dizzy Gillespie's Hot House while recovering from injuries sustained in the army. He attended the Detroit Institute of Music, and studied with pianist Barry Harris.

Later life and career
In Detroit, he played with Lester Young, Wardell Gray, and Lucky Thompson. He moved to New York in 1956 and began playing with Charles Mingus's Jazz Workshop in 1957. Among his credits with Mingus is Tijuana Moods. On East Coasting, Shaw used a Harmon mute, although he was initially wary of using it, given its association with the sound of Miles Davis. Later in 1957 he destroyed his instrument and quit music over a fight with Mingus. He did not return to playing until 1962, after which time he formed his own ensemble. He retired again in 1964 and returned to music once more in 1968. He died in Los Angeles on August 17, 1973. For many years, Gene was an active member of the Chicago Gurdjieff society and a student of Fourth Way psychology, including its music.

Discography

As leader
Breakthrough (Argo, 1962)
Debut in Blue (Argo, 1963)
Carnival Sketches (Argo, 1964)

As sideman
With Charles Mingus
East Coasting (Bethlehem, 1957)
A Modern Jazz Symposium of Music and Poetry (Bethlehem, 1957)
Tijuana Moods (RCA, 1962)

Source:

References

1926 births
1973 deaths
American jazz trumpeters
American male trumpeters
Musicians from Detroit
20th-century American musicians
20th-century trumpeters
Jazz musicians from Michigan
20th-century American male musicians
American male jazz musicians